The Original is the only studio album from American rapper Sarai. Released in 2003 via Sweat/Epic Records. The first single released to radio was "Pack Ya Bags" in 2002. The official single "Ladies" was released in 2003. The album entered the Billboard 200 chart at No. 187.

Track listing

1. "Intro" (0:28)
 Produced by Ali Dee Theodore & Vinny Alfieri for The Grand Skeem
 Co-Produced by Zach Danziger for The Grand Skeem

2. "I Know" (3:58)
 Produced by Scott Storch for Tuff Jew Productions

3. "Mind Ya Business" (3:44)
 Produced by Sanchez

4. "Ladies" (3:22)
 Produced by Ali Dee Theodore & Vinny Alfieri for The Grand Skeem
 Co-Produced by Zach Danziger for The Grand Skeem

5. "What Mama Told Me" (3:08)
 Produced by Ali Dee Theodore, Vinny Alfieri & Zach Danziger for The Grand Skeem

6. "It's Not A Fairytale" (4:03)
 Produced by Allegro for Head Bangers Music, Inc.

7. "Pack Ya Bags" (3:28)
 Produced by Allegro for Head Bangers Music, Inc.

8. "Swear" (featuring Beau Dozier) (3:48)
 Produced by Beau Dozier for Beautown Entertainment

9. "You Could Never" (3:09)
 Produced by Scott Storch for Tuff Jew Productions

10. "L.I.F.E." (featuring Jaguar) (4:58)
 Produced by Scott Storch for Tuff Jew Productions

11. "It's Official" (3:55)
 Produced by LJ "Chocolate Starr" Sutton & Brandon "B-Stylz" McKinney for Infra-Red Entertainment Inc.

12. "Mary Anne" (featuring Black Coffey) (5:14)
 Produced by LJ "Chocolate Starr" Sutton & Brandon "B-Stylz" McKinney for Infra-Red Entertainment Inc.

13. "Black & White" (4:20)
 Produced by Scott Storch for Tuff Jew Productions

Sample credits
"It's Not A Fairytale" contains a sample of Portishead's "Roads".

Singles
2002: "Pack Ya Bags"
2003: "Ladies"

Personnel

Executive producers: David McPherson & Keith Sweat
A&R Direction: David McPherson & Victor Cade
Associate Producers: Infra-Red Entertainment, Inc. & Sweat Records, LLC
Management: Keith Mitchell for One Point Five Management, Inc.
A&R Managers: Verma Miles& Amanda Rosamilia
A&R Coordinator: Elliot Range
Art Direction: Chris Feldmann
Photography: Rod Spice/Art Mix
Photography Cover: Jeff Bender
Styling: Liza Montoya
Makeup: Jay Manuel
Hair: Caprice Green

Leftover tracks

1. "Right Here"
 Produced by Scott Storch for Tuff Jew Productions
 Listed in press release, excluded on commercial release.

2. "I'm In The Mood"
 Produced by Produced by Allegro for Head Bangers Music, Inc.
 Appeared as a snippet on the Pack Ya Bags single.
 Listed in press release, excluded on commercial release.

References 

2003 debut albums
Sarai (rapper) albums
Albums produced by Scott Storch